"The Hunter" is a song by American heavy metal band Dokken, released in 1985 on the album Under Lock and Key. The song was released as the first single from the album. The song peaked at number 25 on the Mainstream Rock chart in the United States. The song remained on the chart for 9 weeks.

Track listing
7" single (Japan)

12" single (US promo)

References

External links
 Official Music Video at YouTube

1985 singles
Dokken songs
1985 songs
Elektra Records singles
Songs written by Don Dokken
Songs written by George Lynch (musician)
Songs written by Jeff Pilson